, is a traditional school (koryū) of Japanese martial arts.  Different styles of Yagyū Shingan-ryū, such as Heihojutsu and Taijutsu, assert different founders, Takenaga Hayato and Araki Mataemon respectively, but they all go back to Ushū Tatewaki (羽州 帯刀), referred to in some historical scrolls as Shindō Tatewaki, who taught a system based on Sengoku-period battlefield tactics, that was called Shindō-ryū.

The word  is rooted in Zen philosophy, and was chosen to describe a fundamental concept of the style.  Shingan means "mind’s eye," or "heart's eye," and refers to the ability to sense or read an opponent's intentions via an inner sense.  Originally called simply Shingan-ryū, it was later renamed Yagyū Shingan-ryū, due to the influence of Yagyu Tajima no Kami Munenori's Yagyū Shinkage-ryū.

Yagyū Shingan-ryū was created to be a battlefield art with a large comprehensive curriculum  
of weapons, and grappling techniques for use both while armored and unarmored. The techniques of Yagyū Shingan-ryū were designed to eliminate an enemy quickly and effortlessly. In the early days, both the Yagyū Shingan and Shinkage schools were similar, as both consisted of an array of armed and unarmed combat techniques. However, as the two schools evolved, the Yagyū Shinkage-ryū focused primarily on swordsmanship (kenjutsu), whereas the Yagyū Shingan-ryū continued as a comprehensive combat system, training several arts, including jujutsu, quarterstaff fighting (bōjutsu), glaive fighting (naginatajutsu), sword drawing techniques (iaijutsu) and sword fighting (kenjutsu).

Takenaga Hayato
Takenaga Hayato (竹永 隼人, dates of birth and death unknown), sometimes known as Takenaga Hayato Kanetsugu (Jikinyu), founded the Yagyū Shingan-ryū, which he taught primarily in what is now known as Sendai, Miyagi.  Before founding the Yagyu Shingan-ryū, Hayato studied Shindō-ryū (神道流), Shinkage-ryū - Divine Shadow (神影流), Shuza-ryū (首座流), Toda-ryū (戸田流) and Edo line (Yagyū) Shinkage-ryū - New Shadow (新陰流).

Takenaga Hayato was clearly influenced by his studies of the Shindō-ryū of Ushū Tatewaki. Takenaga Hayato went to Edo, was employed by the Yagyū family and studied Edo line Yagyū Shinkage-ryū with Yagyū Munenori. The name Yagyū Shingan-ryū was used after Hayato was directed to use the family "Yagyū" name in his art Shingan-ryū by Yagyu Munenori. On return to his home in Sendai, Miyagi he taught the ashigaru until his death.

Following Takenaga Hayato the tradition was passed on to Yoshikawa Ichiroemon, thence Ito Kyuzaburo, then to Koyama Samon who traveled to Edo and became the headmaster of the Edo line of Yagyu Shingan-ryū. Koyama Samon in later years returned to his home where he continued to instruct Yagyū Shingan-ryū.

The Sendai Line of the Yagyu Shingan Ryu is under the guidance of Headmasters Shimazu Sensei (Soke 'Chikuosha') & Hoshi Sensei (Soke 'Ryushinkan').

Araki Mataemon
Araki Mataemon (荒木 又右衛門, 1594–1634) is credited as the spiritual father of the Edo-line of Yagyū Shingan-ryū, later to become known as Yagyū Shingan-ryū Taijutsu. The Edo line stems from headmaster Koyama Samon (1718–1800), who carried the art from Sendai to Edo. While Araki's name appears on the Edo school's historical scrolls, his actual influence on the tradition is unclear. For many, he is considered the spiritual founder of the Yagyu Shingan Ryu Taijutsu tradition, but according to Edo era depictions of the skirmish that made him famous (by killing 37 enemies with only 1 assistant), he fought it without wearing armor. Yagyū Shingan-ryū has evolved over the centuries, with each headmaster refining the art. Although there is no evidence, it is plausible that Koyama Samon may have been influenced or inspired by Araki. This may have led to the differences in appearance and philosophy that exist today from the influence of Hoshino Tenchi. Koyama Samon in later life returned to his home in Sendai.

Araki Mataemon was a practitioner of Yagyū Shinkage-ryū, under his mentor Yagyū Munenori. Legend states that Munenori drew his sword and attacked Araki unexpectedly. Araki defended himself using nothing more than a rolled-up piece of paper. After passing this final test, he was awarded menkyo kaiden by his teacher, Munenori. It is also said that Araki was Yagyu Jubei's teacher. This is portrayed in the popular Japanese television series, "Three Generations of the Yagyū Sword." Originally, Araki's Shingan-ryū was known as "Araki-dō." The Edo-line legend states that it was Yagyū Jubei that granted permission for the use of the Yagyū name. Today, the Edo-line of Yagyū Shingan-ryū Taijutsu, under the guidance of headmaster Kajitsuka Sensei (Soke Arakido), practice the art of Yagyū Shinkage-ryū alongside Yagyū Shingan-ryū Taijutsu (Kajitsuka holds menkyo kaiden in Yagyū Shinkage-ryū).

Branches
There are two main lines of Yagyū Shingan-ryū, and a few offshoot lineages.

Sendai line
The Yagyu Shingan Ryu Heihojutsu (Sendai line) is directed by Headmaster Shimazu Kenji  (Chikuosha).  Shimazu Kenji has studied both the Edo and Sendai line under Headmaster Aizawa Tomio (Edo line - Yorifuji den and Sendai line - Kano den) and the Sendai line under Headmaster, Hoshi Kunio (Sendai line - Hoshi den). The Yagyū Shingan-ryū Heihōjutsu line under Shimazu Kenji is headquartered in Tokyo. Small but strong branches under the direct supervision of Shimazu Kenji exist in Australia (Philip Hinshelwood) and Sweden (Per Eriksson).

The Yagyū Shingan-ryū Heihō (Sendai line) was headed by Hoshi Kunio (Ryushinkan) until his death in 2007. His grandson Hoshi Kunio II [born Hiroaki Kunio] was appointed as his successor; 18th generation headmaster [5th generation family descendant].

The Yagyū Shingan-ryū (Sendai line) has three primary levels within the curriculum, Omote, Ura and Kage. It has a broad focus (weaponry, jujutsu, and kappo) and has been practiced in Sendai area for several generations.

THE SENDAI LINEAGE OF SATO KINBEI is as follows, Takenaga Hayato, Ito Kyuzaburo, Koyama Samon, Aizawa Token, Kato Gonzo, Hishigi Teikichi, Takahashi Hikokichi, Suzuki Hyokichi, Suzuki Sensaku, Sato Kinbei, Duke Meade.
At present Duke Meade, a direct student and lineage holder from Sato Kinbei, lives in America and teaches this lineage in his home town of Columbus Georgia.

Edo line
Yagyū Shingan-ryū Taijutsu (Edo line) is directed by Kajitsuka Yasushi (11th Generation Headmaster). This lineage stems from Koyama Samon, 4th generation headmaster of main-line Yagyu Shingan-ryu Heiho. Koyama operated a dojo in the ancient capital of Edo (modern day Tokyo) for close to 20 years.

The Tokugawa shogunate managed to bring stability to the nation, marking the end of a long period of inner conflict. The armored battlefield tactics naturally evolved into more practical self-defense methods relevant to the locale and social climate. The Taijutsu school was created by Hoshino Tenchi, 8th generation headmaster and is known for its close quarter jujutsu grappling techniques, which require a clear understanding of taijutsu (body movement). In this context, taijutsu refers to the underlying principles of body dynamics, rather than the physical techniques themselves. As the name jujutsu or yawara implies, they are essentially soft techniques and should not require a great deal of brute strength. The aggressiveness of the style remained the same. Some of the trade-mark maneuvers include pole-driving (dropping an opponent on his head), back breaking, and neck snapping. Although the Edo-line of Yagyu Shingan-ryu does not employ the wearing of armor during practice or exhibition, the techniques are clearly related to armored combat. The style includes the usual array of weapons forms, but is distinguished by its unique staff (6 ft) and ōdachi kata.

Unlike modern Japanese budō, which was created for the masses and is largely sport-oriented, kobudō (“ko” being short for koryū, meaning traditional or old) was designed for the warrior, whose sole purpose was to kill or be killed. Many of Japan’s modern budō have their roots in the Yagyū schools of combat. Morihei Ueshiba, the founder of Aikido, was a student of Yagyū Shingan-ryū. In 1908, after five years of training, he received the rank of Shoden from Masakatsu Nakai, a Shihan of the Edo-line of Yagyū Shingan-ryū (stemming from the sixth lineal-headmaster Goto Saburō — hence the name Goto-ha). Likewise, Kano Jigoro, the founder of judo, trained under the seventh lineal-headmaster of the Edo-line (Yagyū Shingan-ryū Taijutsu), Ohshima Masateru.

Yagyū Shingan-ryū Taijutsu (Edo line) is primarily located in Kanagawa Prefecture, Japan.

References

External links
 Official site of the Yagyū Shingan-ryū Heihojutsu 
 Official site of Yagyū Shingan-ryū Taijutsu (Edo-line) 
 Official site of Yagyū Shingan-ryū Heiho (Sendai-line)  (dead link as of April 6, 2010)
 Official site of the Yagyū Shingan-ryū Heiho Jutsu Kyodensho Chikuosha Northern Europe (Under Shimazu-sensei) 
 Yagyū Shingan-ryū Europe 
 Yagyū Shingan-ryū Germany 
 Official site of Yagyū-Shingan-ryū-heijyutu Toyama-dojyo(Sendai-line)

Ko-ryū bujutsu
Japanese martial arts